Malonate decarboxylase holo-(acyl-carrier protein) synthase (holo ACP synthase, '2'-(5''-triphosphoribosyl)-3'-dephospho-CoA:apo ACP 2'-(5''-triphosphoribosyl)-3'-dephospho-CoA transferase, MdcG, 2'-(5''-triphosphoribosyl)-3'-dephospho-CoA:apo-malonate-decarboxylase adenylyltransferase, holo-malonate-decarboxylase synthase) is an enzyme with systematic name 
2'-(5-triphosphoribosyl)-3'-dephospho-CoA:apo-malonate-decarboxylase 2'-(5-phosphoribosyl)-3'-dephospho-CoA-transferase
. This enzyme catalyses the following chemical reaction

 2'-(5-triphosphoribosyl)-3'-dephospho-CoA + malonate decarboxylase apo-[acyl-carrier protein]  malonate decarboxylase holo-[acyl-carrier protein] + diphosphate

The delta subunit of malonate decarboxylase serves as an acyl-carrier protein (ACP) .

References

External links 
 

EC 2.7.7